Gruškovec is a settlement in the Municipality of Cirkulane in the Haloze area of eastern Slovenia, next to the border with Croatia. The area traditionally belonged to the Styria region. It is now included in the Drava Statistical Region.

There is a small simple chapel-shrine in the settlement. It was built in the early 20th century.

References

External links
Gruškovec on Geopedia

Populated places in the Municipality of Cirkulane